The Patrick V. McNamara Federal Building is a class-A skyscraper located at 477 Michigan Avenue in Downtown Detroit, Michigan, designed by the Detroit architectural firm of Smith, Hinchman and Grylls. It opened in 1976 to consolidate the offices of federal agencies which were scattered in several locations in the area. It houses offices of the Consumer Product Safety Commission, Army Corps of Engineers, Defense Contract Management Agency, Federal Bureau of Investigation, United States Department of Housing and Urban Development(HUD), Internal Revenue Service, Peace Corps, Railroad Retirement Board, Veteran Affairs (VA), The American Legion Department of Michigan and Social Security Administration. It is named for Patrick V. McNamara, a Democratic United States Senator from the State of Michigan from 1955 to 1966.

Occupants

U.S. Census Bureau

Architecture

The corners are recessed providing additional strength to the structure and eliminating the battle for corner offices.

The building is surrounded by a large plaza which covers the concourse level, parking garage, loading dock and a sunken fountain. The sculpture, which consists of crushed auto body panels, was commissioned under the Art in Architecture program by General Services Administration (GSA) in 1977 for $100,000. However, it could not be placed at its intended location due to deterioration of the plaza. After the GSA and building's contractor reached a settlement for repairs, it was installed in 1987. Between the time of its completion in 1983 and 1987, the sculpture was placed at Walter P. Reuther Library of Labor and Urban Affairs on the campus of nearby Wayne State University. From the time of its installation at Wayne State, the sculpture proved unpopular with critics and members of the public.

During additional repairs to the plaza in 2001, the sculpture was removed and sent for conservation. The years of exposure to the elements caused damage and GSA made the decision to relocate it to an interior space. After a two-year search for a recipient, the College for Creative Studies agreed to accept the work for its new A. Alfred Taubman Center for Design Education. It was installed for the center's opening in 2009.

The lobby of the building houses three works, an acrylic and fiber painting by Sam Gilliam entitled Box Cars Grand and an oil on panel piece by Harold Cohn called Decorative Map of Belle Isle.

On September 22, 2001, a Federal Officer was killed in the lobby by a visitor who became angry when told he would not be able to take his gun into the building.

See also
 List of tallest buildings in Detroit

References

Further reading

External links
 Official building site
 
 

Skyscraper office buildings in Detroit
Downtown Detroit
Government buildings completed in 1976
1976 establishments in Michigan